Prasophyllum occultans, commonly known as the hidden leek orchid, is a species of orchid endemic to southern Australia. It has a single, smooth, tube-shaped leaf with a reddish-purple base and up to ten greenish flowers. It is a rare species found only in a few locations in South Australia and in far western Victoria.

Description
The flowering stem emerges about half-way along the leaf. As with others in the genus, the flowers are inverted so that the labellum is above the column rather than below it. The upturned part is triangular with a wavy edge and there is a greenish-brown callus in its centre. Flowering occurs in September and early October and the flowers are "apparently apomictic".

Taxonomy and naming
Prasophyllum occultans was first formally described in 1989 by Robert Bates and the description was published in Journal of the Adelaide Botanic Garden from a specimen collected in the Lincoln Conservation Park. The specific epithet (occultans) is a Latin word meaning "hidden" or "concealed", referring to the difficulty of finding this orchid, due to its size and coloration.

Distribution and habitat
The hidden leek orchid mostly in mallee-broombush and is found on the Eyre Peninsula, Yorke Peninsula, upper South-Eastern botanical region of South Australia and possibly Kangaroo Island. There is a single record from far western Victoria.

References

External links 
 

occultans
Flora of South Australia
Plants described in 1989
Endemic orchids of Australia